Knyaz Ivan Mikhailovich Obolensky, or Prince John Obolenski (1853 – 28 February 1910), was an Imperial Russian Lieutenant-General.

He served as the Governor-General of Finland from 18 August 1904 to 18 November 1905. His predecessor Nikolai Ivanovich Bobrikov was assassinated in June 1904. As soon as his term as Governor-General started, he received a telegram from an unknown sender, saying: "We are expecting you in the near future -stop- The weather here is +200°C -stop- Bobrikov".

He was a member of a Rurikid princely family, whose ancestors once ruled one of the Upper Principalities. His mother was the Romanian-born aristocrat Olga Sturdza, daughter of Alexandru Sturdza (from a non-princely branch, 3rd cousin once removed of the Russian statesman Alexandru Sturdza), grand-treasurer of the Principality of Moldova, by Elena Ghika. His father was Knyaz (Prince) Mikhail Aleksandrovich Obolensky (1821–1886).

His term of office saw revolutionary turmoil in both Russia and the Grand Duchy of Finland. The Russian revolution of 1905 resulted in a general strike in Finland and the replacement of the feudal Diet of Finland with the modern Parliament of Finland.

Knyaz Obolensky was murdered by revolutionaries in St. Petersburg.

References

Further reading
 Vsevolod Vladimirov: The Revolution in Finland under Prince John Obolensky translated by Victor E. Marsden (London: Wyman & Sons, Ltd., 1911).

|-

1853 births
1910 deaths
Ivan Mikhailovich
Russian people of Romanian descent
Governors of the Grand Duchy of Finland